Peace Beyond Passion is the second studio album by American musician Me'shell Ndegeocello, released on June 25, 1996, on Maverick Records. The album peaked at No. 63 on the Billboard 200 albums chart and No. 15 on the Top R&B Albums chart in 1996. It went on to become Ndegeocello's most commercially successful album. Widely acclaimed at the time of its release, the album received numerous awards and accolades including a nomination for the Grammy Award for Best R&B Album at the 39th Grammy Awards in 1997. 

The first single, "Leviticus: Faggot" peaked at No. 15 on the Billboard Dance Music/Club Play chart in 1996. The second single, a cover of "Who Is He (And What Is He to You)?" by Bill Withers, reached No. 1 on the Billboard Dance Music/Club Play chart in November 1996 and No. 34 on the R&B singles chart. The album's third single, a remix of the ballad "Stay", peaked at No. 15 on the Dance Music/Club Play chart and No. 67 on the R&B singles chart.

The album was released on vinyl for the first time on June 12, 2021, as part of Record Store Day.

Track listing
All songs written by Me'shell Ndegéocello, except where noted.
"The Womb" – 1:25
"The Way" – 4:58
"Deuteronomy: Niggerman" – 4:01
"Ecclesiastes: Free My Heart" (Ndegéocello, Torri Ruffin) – 5:22
"Leviticus: Faggot" – 6:08
"Mary Magdalene" – 5:51
"God Shiva" (Ndegéocello, Wendy Melvoin) – 4:09
"Who Is He and What Is He to You" (Bill Withers, Stan McKinney) – 4:49
"Stay" – 4:30
"Bittersweet" – 5:17
"A Tear and a Smile" – 3:49
"Make Me Wanna Holler" (Ndegéocello, Federico González Peña, Melvin Ragin, Marvin Gaye, James Nyx) – 8:51

Personnel
Me'Shell Ndegéocello – bass guitar, percussion (#1), drum programming (#2, 11), lead guitar (#5), and all other instruments (#1–11)
David Gamson – drum programming (#1–3, 9–11), drums and atmosphere (#6)
Wah Wah Watson – guitar (#1), "wah guitar" (#5, 8, 12), acoustic guitar (#8)
Wendy Melvoin – guitar (#2, 7, 10), guitar arrangement (#2, 7), acoustic guitar (#6)
David Fiuczynski – guitar solo (#4, 7)
Allen Cato – guitar (#4)
Billy Preston – organ (#3, 8, 11)
Federico González Peña – Fender Rhodes piano (#4, 5, 12), percussion (#1)
Joshua Redman – saxophones (#2, 3, 6, 10)
Bennie Maupin – bass clarinet (#3)
Oliver Gene Lake – drums (#1, 3–5, 8, 10, 12)
Luis Conte – percussion (#3–5, 7, 10, 12)
Daniel Sadownick – percussion (#1)
Arranged by David Gamson and Me'Shell NdegéocelloVocals arranged by David Gamson
String arrangements for tracks #5, 8 an 11 by Paul Riser
Production
Produced by David Gamson
Recording engineer – Rail Jon Rogut
Additional engineering – David Gamson and Charles Nasser
Recording engineer for track #4 – Mike Krowiak, assisted by Suzanne Dyer
Mixing – Bob Power
Mastering – Tom Coyne
Gregory-Trevor Gilmer – art direction
Guzman (Constance Hansen & Russell Peacock) – photography

Charts

References

External links
Review of Peace Beyond Passion and Toni Braxton's Secrets at Rolling Stone

Meshell Ndegeocello albums
1996 albums
Albums arranged by Paul Riser
Albums arranged by David Campbell (composer)
Maverick Records albums